The Musgamagw Tsawataineuk is a First Nations tribal council based in the Queen Charlotte Strait region around northern Vancouver Island in British Columbia, Canada.

The headquarters of the Musgamagw Tsawataineuk Tribal Council is in the community of Quinsam, British Columbia in Campbell River, but territories of the three member nations span the Mainland Inlets of the Broughton Archipelago just to the north of the mouth of Knight Inlet.

Member governments
Kwicksutaineuk-ah-kwa-mish First Nation (see also Kwicksutaineuk-ah-kwa-mish) 
Tsawataineuk First Nation
Gwawanenuk First Nation

See also

Kwakwaka'wakw
Kwak'wala (language)
List of tribal councils in British Columbia

External links
Musgamagw Tsawataineuk Tribal Council website
Map of Member Nations territories

Kwakwaka'wakw governments
First Nations tribal councils in British Columbia